This is a list of fellows of the Royal Society elected in 1996.

Fellows
Alfred Rodney Adams
Jan Mary Anderson
Jonathan Felix Ashmore
David Beach
John Michael Brown
Christopher Martin Dobson
Patrick Joseph Dowling
Dianne Edwards
Peter Philip Edwards
Andrew Christopher Fabian
William James Feast
Michael Denis Gale  (1943–2009)
David Gubbins
Frederick Duncan Michael Haldane
Thomas Michael Jessell
Sir David Philip Lane
Martin Geoffrey Low  (1950-2013)
Andrew Geoffrey Lyne
Nicholas Stephen Manton
Francis Patrick McCormick
Iain MacIntyre  (d. 2009)
Thomas Wilson Meade
Stewart Crichton Miller  (1934-1999)
Ian Mark Mills
Mudumbai Seshachalu Narasimhan
Linda Partridge
Malcolm Peaker
John Anthony Pickett
Peter Nicholas Pusey
Sir Martin Roth  (1917-2006)
Christopher Tadeusz Czeslaw Sachrajda
Ekhard Karl Hermann Salje
Timothy Shallice
George David William Smith
Edwin Smith
David Ian Stuart
Grant Robert Sutherland
Martin John Taylor
Phillip Vallentine Tobias  (1925–2012)
James Hunter Whitelaw  (1936-2006)

Foreign members
James Edwin Darnell
Jacques Louis Lions  (1928-2001)
Vernon Benjamin Mountcastle
James Robert Rice
Michael G Rossmann
Martin Schwarzschild  (1912-1997)

References

1996
1996 in science
1996 in the United Kingdom